Fraser Trebilcock is a law firm in Michigan. It has offices in Lansing, Detroit, and Grand Rapids, and is associated with SCG Legal, of which it is the sole Michigan member. In 2013, Michigan Lawyers Weekly ranked Fraser Trebilcock as Michigan's 28th largest law firm. Crain's Detroit Business ranked the firm as Michigan's 8th largest among "Outstate Law Firms" (ranking of size based on attorneys headquartered outside of Metro Detroit).

History
Fraser Trebilcock was founded by Rollin H. Person, who began his private practice in Lansing in 1883, and was appointed to the Michigan Supreme Court in 1915. The firm became was later named Fraser Trebilcock Davis & Dunlap, P.C., and is now known as Fraser Trebilcock.

Practice areas
The firm provides counsel in more than 70 areas of legal practice.

Recognition 
 Martindale-Hubbell Peer Review Rating
 25 Attorneys with AV Preeminent rating
 Best Law Firms in America
 Tier 1 ranking in 7 practice areas
 Tier 2 ranking in 5 practice areas
Super Lawyers
Fraser Trebilcock has had 20 attorneys selected as Super Lawyers since 2006.

References

Companies based in Lansing, Michigan
Law firms based in Michigan
Law firms established in 1883
1883 establishments in Michigan